Ford vs. Chevy is a racing video game published by 2K Games and developed by Eutechnyx. It was released on November 9, 2005 for the PlayStation 2 and Xbox.

Plot
The Ford vs. Chevy rivalry began with characters Eddie Olson and Tyrone Baker, respectively racing a Ford Model T and a Chevrolet 490 in the earliest days of automobile racing. Other people started to join the party when the rivalry grew.

Gameplay
The player controls around 48 Ford and Chevrolet vehicles. The main game mode is the Westington Cup - here, all kinds of races are available.
There are normal races, where the player races against three rival team members and two of their teammates. The player can choose to command their teammates to "Attack" or "Defend" so they can gain an advantage.

Other races include a 1/4 mile drag, as well as various missions involving such mechanics as smashing billboards or driving a journalist around to take photos.

References

2005 video games
Chevrolet
Racing video games
Ford video games
PlayStation 2 games
Xbox games
Eutechnyx games
Video games developed in the United Kingdom
Global Star Software games
Multiplayer and single-player video games